TNT is the first album by the Norwegian heavy metal band TNT. It is their only album to feature Norwegian lyrics.

In 1984, the first half of the album (side 1 on the original vinyl release) was re-recorded with English lyrics and released as an EP also named TNT. Bass player Steinar Eikum had been replaced by Morten Skaget (credited as Morty Black) for the English language recording. Two tracks would also reappear in English versions later, with Tony Harnell on vocals. Harnell rewrote the lyrics for "U.S.A." before the band included it on the Knights of the New Thunder LP and CD. "Eddie" came as a bonus track on Knights of the New Thunder and the single American Tracks. The English version of "Harley-Davidson" has been performed live several times by Harnell as well as his successor Tony Mills.

Track listing

Personnel

Band
Dag Ingebrigtsen – lead vocals and rhythm guitars
Ronni Le Tekrø – lead guitars
Steinar Eikum – bass guitar
Diesel Dahl – drums, percussion

Album credits
Bjørn Nessjø – producer
Rune Nordahl – engineer

References

Sources
http://www.ronniletekro.com/discography-album-8.html

TNT (Norwegian band) albums
1982 debut albums